Have It All may refer to:

 Have It All (A. J. McLean album), 2010
 Have It All (Bethel Music album), 2016
 "Have It All" (Bethel Music and Brian Johnson song), 2016
 Have It All (Jesse McCartney album), 2010
 "Have It All" (Foo Fighters song), 2003
 Have It All, album by Planningtorock, 2006
 "Have It All" (Jason Mraz song), 2018

See also
 Having It All (disambiguation)